Martin Richard Gilks (2 March 1965 – 3 April 2006) was an English musician. He was a founder member and original drummer for the Wonder Stuff, based in Stourbridge (West Midlands, England).

Gilks who was born in Stourbridge, was originally the drummer with the Midlands-based Mighty Lemon Drops before leaving in 1985 (allegedly sacked for not wanting to cut his hair), and later joined Miles Hunt, Malcolm Treece, and Rob "The Bass Thing" Jones to form the Wonder Stuff in March 1986. As part of the Wonder Stuff, Gilks went on to have a string of top-forty singles and an album as well as being voted the best drummer on the planet in an NME poll in 1989. The group split up in 1994.

He continued to work with Treece and Paul Clifford (Rob Jones' replacement who joined the Wonder Stuff in 1990) after the split under the name of We Know Where You Live with Ange Dolittle (formerly of Eat) on lead vocals.

Gilks left the group at the end of 1995 to join his brother "Tank" in forming Furtive Mass Transit Systems, a management company who would later look after Reef, Lowgold, Cable, A and Hundred Reasons.  We Know Where You Live disbanded the following year.

When the Wonder Stuff reformed in 2000, performing five sell-out shows at the London venue Forum, Gilks also acted as the group's manager and continued to do so until a much-publicised split of the original members in 2004.

Gilks died, aged 41, on 3 April 2006, after losing control of his motorbike in London.

References

External links
 BBC News - Wonder Stuff drummer dies at 41, retrieved 5 April 2006

1965 births
2006 deaths
English rock drummers
British male drummers
English music managers
Motorcycle road incident deaths
Road incident deaths in London
People from Stourbridge
Musicians from the West Midlands (county)
The Wonder Stuff members
20th-century English businesspeople
20th-century British male musicians